Alan Greenberg is the name of:

 Alan C. Greenberg (1927–2014), former Chairman of the Executive Committee of The Bear Stearns Companies, Inc.
 Alan Greenberg (businessman) (born 1947), President of Avenues: The World School
 Alan Greenberg (film director) (1950–2015), American film director, screenwriter, photographer and author

See also
Allan Greenberg (born 1938), architect